G. Madhavan Nair (born 31 October 1943) is an Indian space scientist and a former Chairman of the Indian Space Research Organisation, and Secretary to the Department of Space, Government of India. He has also been the Chairman of the Space Commission and Chairman of the Governing Body of the Antrix Corporation, Bangalore. He was Chairman of the Board of Governors of the Indian Institute of Technology Patna until he stepped down due to his involvement in a controversial deal relating to sale of radio spectrum bandwidth involving Antrix. He was subsequently barred from holding any government positions.

Nair was awarded the Padma Vibhushan, India's second highest civilian honour, on 26 January 2009.

Early life
Nair was born in Kulasekharam, Travancore State, (now in Kanyakumari district, Tamil Nadu), India. He graduated with a B.Sc. in Engineering (1966) from College of Engineering, Trivandrum, of the University of Kerala with specialization in Electronics & Communication Engineering. After his graduation, Nair attended a training program at the Bhabha Atomic Research Center (BARC) Training School, Mumbai.

Career
Nair is a leading technologist in the field of rocket systems and has made significant contribution to the development of multi-stage satellite launch vehicles, achieving self-reliance in independent access to space using indigenous technologies. Nair and his team have advanced their work in the face of several challenges in the regime of technology denials by adopting several innovations and novel techniques to realise world class launch vehicle systems. India today has a pride of place amongst the space-faring nations in launch vehicle technology. Specifically, as Project Director, he led the development of Polar Satellite Launch Vehicle (PSLV) which has since become the workhorse for launching mainly Indian remote sensing satellites.

As Director of ISRO's largest R & D Centre, the Vikram Sarabhai Space Centre, he also saw India's Geo-synchronous Satellite Launch Vehicle (GSLV) successfully come to fruition. Further, as Director of the Liquid Propulsion Systems Centre of ISRO, he played a central role in the design and development of the crucial cryogenic engine for GSLV. A list of Positions held before is listed below:

As Chairman of ISRO
As the Chairman of Indian Space Research Organization, Nair is entrusted with the responsibility for the development of space technology and its application to national development. During his tenure as Chairman, ISRO/Secretary, DOS, twenty seven successful missions were accomplished i.e., INSAT-3E, Resourcesat-1, Edusat, Cartosat-1, Hamsat-1, INSAT-4A, PSLV-C5, GSLV-F01, PSLV-C6, Cartosat-2, INSAT-4B, SRE-1, PSLV-C7, PSLV-C8, GSLV-F04, INSAT-4CR, PSLV-C10, Cartosat-2A, IMS-1, PSLV-C9, Chandrayaan-1, PSLV-C11, PSLV-C12, RISAT-2, ANUSAT, PSLV-C14 and Ocensat-2 . He has taken initiatives towards development of futuristic technologies to enhance the space systems capabilities as well as to reduce the cost of access to space. Nair has given major thrust for evolving application programmes such as tele-education and telemedicine for meeting the needs of society at large. As Chairman Space Commission, Nair is responsible for chalking out the future plan for space research in the country. Major thrust are in scientific exploration of outer space using the Astrosat and Chandrayaan (moon) missions apart from implementing schemes for telemedicine, tele-education and disaster management support systems. He is also providing guidance and leadership in undertaking new technology developments related to launch vehicle, spacecraft for communication, remote sensing and applications programmes to meet societal needs.

In the international arena, Nair has led the Indian delegations for bilateral cooperation and negotiations with many Space Agencies and Countries, specially with France, Russia, Brazil, Israel, etc., and has been instrumental in working out mutually beneficial international cooperative agreements. Nair has led the Indian delegation to the S&T Sub-Committee of United Nations Committee on Peaceful Uses of Outer Space (UN-COPUOS) since 1998.

His main focus has always been to achieve self-reliance in the high technology areas and to bring the benefits of space technology to India's development, specially targeting the needs of the rural and poor sections of society.

Establishment of the Indian Institute of Space Science and Technology
G. Madhavan Nair initiated and implemented the establishment of Indian Institute of Space Science and Technology in Thiruvananthapuram. There were some objections and impediments in its establishment.

Controversies in S-Band Devas Scam
The contract signed between Antrix Corporation and Devas Multimedia Private Limited on 28 January 2005 during Nair's tenure as chairman of ISRO and secretary of Department of Space, was controversial. As a consequence of it, on 25 January 2012 he was barred from holding any government jobs. , he was still awaiting trial.

Additional responsibilities
Nair has promoted space science and technology for the socio-economic benefit of India, he is also the Chairman of the Governing Body of the Antrix Corporation, Bangalore. He was chairman of the National Remote Sensing Agency until it became National Remote Sensing Centre.

He was president of Astronautical Society of India in 2004 and of the Aeronautical Society of India in 2005, as well as vice-president of the Scientific Activities Committee of the International Academy of Astronautics (IAA) from 2006. In August 2009, he was elected president of the IAA. He is the only Indian and the first non-American to IAA.

Nair was General President of the 97th Indian Science Congress 2009-2010 and first chairman of the board of governors of Indian Institute of Technology Patna.

Awards
Nair has won several awards such as National Aeronautical Award, FIE Foundation's Award, Shri Om Prakash Bhasin Award, Swadeshi Sastra Puraskar Award, Vikram Sarabhai Memorial Gold Medal of the Indian Science Congress Association, Dr.Yelavarthy Nayudamma Memorial Award-2004, HK Firodia Award-2005,  Fifth "Shri Balvantbhai Parekh Award", Lokmanya Tilak Award from Tilak Smarak Trust, "Sree Chithira Thirunal Award" from Sree Chithira Thirunal Trust, "MP Birla Memorial Award 2009", "Bhu Ratna Award", "Mohamed Abdu Rahiman Sahib National Award", "AV Rama Rao Technology Award", "Chanakya Award" etc., He has also received Gold Medal from the Prime Minister at the 94th Indian Science Congress at Chidambaram in 2007. He received M M Chugani award for 2006, conferred by Indian Physics Association at IIT Mumbai during March 2008. He was also conferred with "Raja Rammohan Puraskar" award on the 236th birth anniversary of Raja Rammohan Roy at Kolkata during May 2008.

The Government of India awarded Nair the Padma Bhushan in 1998 and the Padma Vibhushan in 2009.

Nair has received numerous honorary degrees, including:

D.Philosophy: Punjab Technical University, Jalandhar (2003).
D.Sc.: Sri Venkateswara University, Tirupati (2004), Indian Institute of Technology Delhi (2004), Rani Durgavati Vishwavidyalaya, Jabalpur (2005), Indira Gandhi National Open University, Delhi (2005), Rani Durgavati Vishwavidyalaya, Jabalpur (2005), Cochin University of Science and Technology, Kochi (2006), Rajiv Gandhi Technical University, Bhopal (2007), University of Kerala, Kerala (2007), SRM Institute of Science and Technology, Chennai (2008), Pandit Ravishankar Shukla University, Raipur (2009), Karnatak University, Dharwad (2009), Indian Institute of Technology Bombay (2009), Indian Institute of Technology Kharagpur (2009)
Honorary Doctorate by Suresh Gyan Vihar University, Jaipur (2014)
Honorary Doctorate by Amity University, Gurgaon 2015

Fellowships/Memberships
Fellow, Indian National Academy of Engineering.
Fellow, Astronautical Society of India.
Fellow, National Academy of Sciences, India.
Honorary Fellow, Indian Society for Non-Destruction Testing (ISNT).
Member, System Society of India.
Member, Working Committee of the Current Science Association 2004-06.
Member, International Academy of Astronautics (2004).
Senior Associate, National Institute of Advanced Studies (2004–2007).
President, Intersputnik Board (2005)
Honorary Fellow of The Aeronautical Society of India (2007).
Honorary Life fellow Institution of Engineers (India) Kolkata (2008)
Chairman, Research Council of National Aerospace Laboratories (April 2007 to March 2010).
President of the International Academy of Astronautics (2009)

Publications
In August 2017, Nair's autobiography, titled Agnipareekshakal, was published.

See also
Chairman of the Indian Space Research Organization

References

External links

 ISRO biography

Malayali people
Indian Space Research Organisation people
Recipients of the Padma Bhushan in science & engineering
Recipients of the Padma Vibhushan in science & engineering
Scientists from Thiruvananthapuram
People from Kanyakumari district
Living people
1943 births
Indian aerospace engineers
University of Kerala alumni
21st-century Indian astronomers
20th-century Indian astronomers
Engineers from Kerala
20th-century Indian engineers
21st-century Indian engineers